Aaron Sachs (born 1969) is a historian and Cornell University professor who primarily studies American environmental and cultural history.

Life
He graduated from Harvard University in 1992 with a B.A. in history and literature, and from Yale University, with a Ph.D. in American Studies, in 2004.

He teaches at Cornell University in Ithaca, NY.

Awards
 2007 Frederick Jackson Turner Award honorable mention.
 2023 National Book Critics Circle Award in Biography Finalist.

Selected publications
 Up from the Depths: Herman Melville, Lewis Mumford, and Rediscovery in Dark Times (Princeton University Press, 2022) 
Arcadian America: The Death and Life of an Environmental Tradition (Yale University Press, 2013)
"Special Topics in Calamity History", Reviews in American History, Volume 35, Number 3, September 2007, pp. 453–463
  (reprint Penguin 2007)

References
5. Thoreau Society Bulletin, A Different Kind of Wildness: Environmental Humor and Cultural Resilience. Number 104, Winter 2019.

External links
"The Humboldt Current: Science, Adventure, and Environmentalism with author Aaron Sachs", World's Fair, November 5, 2007, Benjamin Cohen 

20th-century American historians
American male non-fiction writers
21st-century American historians
21st-century American male writers
Harvard College alumni
Yale Graduate School of Arts and Sciences alumni
Cornell University Department of History faculty
Living people
1969 births
20th-century American male writers